Lawrence Thomas may refer to:

 Lawrence Thomas (soccer) (born 1992), Australian footballer
 Lawrence S. Thomas III, American brigadier general
 Lawrence Thomas (American football) (born 1993), American football defensive end
 Lawrence Thomas (priest) (1889–1960), Archdeacon of Margam

See also
Laurence Thomas

Larry Thomas (disambiguation)